Kārlis Ozoliņš (born 15 June 2002) is a Latvian tennis player.

Ozoliņš has a career high ATP singles ranking of World No. 987 achieved on 27 February 2021.

As a junior, he had a career high ITF junior combined ranking of number 6 in the world achieved on 3 February 2020. He reached the boys' doubles final at the 2020 Australian Open alongside Mikolaj Lorens. They were defeated however, by Leandro Riedi and David Ionel in a very close three-set match 7–6(10–8), 5–7, [4–10].

Ozoliņš represents Latvia at the Davis Cup, where he has a W/L record of 0–1 in singles and 1–0 in doubles combining as 1–1.

ATP Challenger and ITF World Tennis Tour finals

Singles: 1 (0–1)

Junior Grand Slam finals

Doubles: 1 (1 runner-up)

References

External links

2002 births
Living people
Latvian male tennis players
Sportspeople from Riga
Illinois Fighting Illini men's tennis players